Rubulavirinae is a subfamily of viruses in the family Paramyxoviridae. Humans, apes, pigs, and dogs serve as natural hosts. There are currently 18 species in the two genera Orthorubulavirus and Pararubulavirus. Diseases associated with this genus include mumps. Members of the subfamily are collectively called rubulaviruses. The subfamily was previously a genus named Rubulavirus but was elevated to subfamily in 2018. Viruses of this subfamily appear to be most closely related to members of Avulavirinae.

Taxonomy
Subfamily: Rubulavirinae
Genus: Orthorubulavirus
Genus: Pararubulavirus

Structure
Rubulavirions are enveloped, with spherical geometries. The diameter is around 150 nm. Rubulavirus genomes are linear, around 15kb in length. The genome codes for 8 proteins.

Life cycle
Viral replication is cytoplasmic. Entry into the host cells is achieved after viral attachment to host cells. Replication follows the negative stranded RNA virus replication model. Negative-stranded RNA virus transcription, using polymerase stuttering, through co-transcriptional RNA editing is the method of transcription. The virus exits the host cell by budding. Humans, apes, pigs, and dogs serve as the natural host. Transmission routes are respiratory and saliva.

References

External links
 ICTV Report: Paramyxoviridae
 Viralzone: Rubulavirus
 http://www.biology-online.org/dictionary/Rubulavirus
 Virus Pathogen Database and Analysis Resource (ViPR): Paramyxoviridae
 

Mononegavirales
Paramyxoviridae
Rubulaviruses